Sri Lanka Tennis Association (SLTA) is a national governing body of tennis in Sri Lanka, which represents Sri Lanka on associations like the International Tennis Federation and the Asian Tennis Federation. Its main aim is to popularise tennis in all parts of Sri Lanka as a professional sport and to produce top tennis players from Sri Lanka.

History
Tennis in Sri Lanka was introduced during the British Rule with the founding of the Ceylon Lawn Tennis Association in 1915. The CLTA was originally headquartered at the ‘Challet’ in Nuwara Eliya and was conducting the Nationals on clay courts located at where Hill Club now sits. CLTC held tournaments in Colombo too, especially at the Colombo Lawn Club. The Governor of Ceylon, Robert Chalmers, 1st Baron Chalmers, was the first president of the association. From establishment of the association until 1946, there was a practice at the CLTA to have the Governor of Ceylon, as administrative head of the British colony, as its President. The first Sri Lankan to become CLTA president was Dr. C. H. Gunasekara in 1947 until 1949. It takes pride as being the oldest national tennis association in Asia.

List of Sri Lankan presidents
Included:
 Dr. C. H. Gunasekara, (1947-1949)
 T. E. de Silva, (1950-1954)
 Lionel Fonseka (1955-1957)
 Mr. V. A. Sugathadasa, (1958-1968)
 M. T. Thiruchittampalam, (1969-1975)
 Mr. K. T. E. de Silva ?
 Mr. Janaka Bogollagama ?
 Mr. D.L. Seneviratne, (1987-1990)
 Mr. D.L. Seneviratne, (1991-2000)
 Mr. Suresh Subramaniam, (2001-2006) 
 Mr. Maxwell de Silva, (2009-2010)
 Mr. Iqbal Bil Isaack, (2012-current)

List of governor presidents
Included:
 Sir Robert Chalmers (1915-16)
 Sir John Anderson (1916-19)
 Sir William Henry Manning (1919-27)
 Sir Herbert J. Stanley (1927-31)
 Sir Graeme Thomson (1931-33)
 Sir Reginald Edward Stubbs (1933-37)
 Sir Andrew Caldecott (1937-42)
 Sir  Henry Monck-Mason Moore (1945-46)

Tennis in Sri Lanka
Tennis as a sport has not garnered the popular support of the common folk in Sri Lanka, whose first love in sports is still cricket but SLTA is contributing all its resources to make tennis a popular game. They strive towards developing tennis as a professional sport, encouraging all citizens to play tennis for better health in life and to produce better world ranking tennis players from Sri Lanka.

Tournaments conducted by SLTA

Current

International
Include:
 Sri Lanka Men's Futures F1  
 Sri Lanka Men's Futures F2 
 Sri Lanka Men's Futures F3 
 Davis Cup Asia/Oceania Group III 
 ITF Junior Circuit Grade 5 Week 1 (U-18) 
 ITF Junior Circuit Grade 5 Week 2 (U-18) 
 ITF Junior Circuit Grade 5 Week 3 (U-18) 
 Sri Lanka Women's Futures F1  
 Sri Lanka Women's Futures F2  
 Sri Lanka Women's Futures F3  
 ATF Week 1 (U-14)  
 ATF Week 2 (U-14)

National
Include:
 ACM Tennis School Tournament, Tamil Union Club, Colombo 
 All-Island Inter-School Cool Championship, SLTA, Colombo 
 Bandarawela Tennis Club Tournament, Bandarawela 
 Batticaloa Tennis Centre Tournament, Batticaloa 
 Colombo Championships, (1915-current)
 CR and FC Tournament, CF & FC Club, Longdon Place 
 DTS Tournament, St. Thomas' College Club, Colombo 
 Inter-Schools Cool Divisional Qualifying Tournament
 Jaffna Club Tournament, St. Patrick's College Tennis Club, Jaffna
 Kalutara Tennis Centre Tournament, Kalutara 
 Kandy Garden Club Tournament, Kandy Garden Club, Kandy 
 Kurunegala Club Tournament, Kurunegala Tennis Club, Kurenagala
 Moors Club Open Tournament, Moors Tennis Club, Colombo
 Negombo Club Tournament, Negombo Tennis Club, Negombo, (1975-current)
 Otters Club Tournament, Otters Tennis Club, Colombo, (1965-current)
 Queen's Club Open Tournament, Queen's Club, Colombo, (1969-current)
 SLTA Playing Section Tournament, SLTA, Colombo 
 SLTA Tournament, SLTA, Colombo 
 SSC Open Tournament, SSC Tennis Club, Colombo
 Thurstan College Tournament, Thurstan, Colombo 
  Women's Club Tournament, Women's Club, Colombo 
 Tamil Union Club Tournament, Tamil Union, Colombo, (1972-current)

Former
Overseen by the SLTA have included:
 Carlton Club Championships, Colombo, (1960–1964).
 Ceylon Championships,  Nuwara Eliya, (1886-1976),  later renamed Sri Lankan National Championships is still played today.
 Ceylon Wimbledon Championships  (1887–1890), Nuwara Eliya.
 Colombo Otters Open (1964–1974).
 Colombo tournament, Colombo (1963–1971).
 Floodlight Open,  (1963).
 Fort Tennis Club Open, Fort, Colombo, (1964–1967).
 Government Services Tennis Club Championships, Colombo, (1966-?)
 Negombo Championships, Negombo, (1963–1974).
 Sabaragamuwa Championships, Ratnapura, (1963–1969).
 Taldua Open, Colombo, (1965).
 Tamil Union Championships, Colombo, (1970–1971).
 UVA Championships, Badulla, (1967).
 Up-Country Nationals, Bandarawela, (1955–1971).

List of approved SLTA tennis clubs
This is a list of major tennis clubs within Sri Lanka:
 Bandarawela tennis club
 Carlton Tennis club
 Cathedral Tennis club
 Chilow sports club
 Dehiwala /Mt.Lavinia Cosmopolitan Sports Club
 Dickoya / Maskeliya cricket club
 Galle services club
 Govt. servants lawn tennis club
 Govt. servants tennis club
 Govt. Surveyors sports club
 Gymkhana tennis club
 Kalutara lawn tennis club
 Kandana club
 Kandy Garden Club
 K.C.Y.M.A. Tennis club
 Rathnapura Tennis School
 Matale District Tennis Club

References

Sri Lanka
Tennis

Sports organizations established in 1915
Tennis in Sri Lanka
1915 establishments in Ceylon